Breaking the Surface is a best-selling book by Greg Louganis, co-written with Eric Marcus published in 1996. The book spent five weeks at number one on the New York Times Best Seller list.

Louganis chronicles his winning of back-to-back double gold medals at the 1984 Summer Olympics and 1988 Summer Olympics, and his self-doubt and lack of confidence that held him back personally and professionally because of concealing his sexual orientation as a gay athlete. This is about him coming out as an HIV-positive gay man.

As a follow-up to the success of the book, Canadian television and film director Steven Hilliard Stern directed Breaking the Surface: The Greg Louganis Story in 1997, starring Mario Lopez as Louganis, with Louganis also appearing in certain scenes of the television film and as narrator. Louganis also produced a video diary called Looking To the Light, which picked up where Breaking the Surface left off.

External links
  Greg Louganis Official website
 Eric Marcus official website

1996 books
American autobiographies
Sports autobiographies
Olympic Games books